Pribilof Island School District or Pribilof School District is a school district headquartered on the grounds of St. Paul School in St. Paul, Alaska. It serves students living on the two inhabited Pribilof Islands, Saint Paul Island and Saint George Island.

Schools
The district operates St. Paul School, which has 73 K-12 students, and a correspondence program, which has eight K-10 students.

Until 2017, the district also operated St. George School. The school was forced to close due after its enrollment fell under the minimum of ten students required to receive state funding. The students on that island are served by the correspondence program.

References

External links
 

School districts in Alaska
Aleutians West Census Area, Alaska
Education in Unorganized Borough, Alaska
Saint Paul Island (Alaska)